The Football Federation of Turkmenistan  (TFF) is the governing body of football in Turkmenistan.

History 
The Federation was founded in 1992 and in 1994 was admitted to FIFA, which registers all the matches of the national teams of all member countries. The national team of Turkmenistan registered their first matches as being held in 1992, and FIFA counted those matches on the basis that, although the Football Federation of Turkmenistan became a member of FIFA in 1994, the national team of Turkmenistan was allowed since 1992 to participate in tournament play. The Federation additionally boasts membership in the Asian Football Confederation since 1994.

In March 2003 Football Federation of Turkmenistan held a special conference. As a result of a secret ballot, Allaberdy Mammetkuliyev was elected Chairman.

In March 2007, FIFA President Joseph S. Blatter and  AFC President Mohamed Bin Hammam opened the House of Football - new headquarters of the Football Association of Turkmenistan - which is located in one of the luxury houses in the southern part of Ashgabat.

The May 2008 election saw just one nomination for the position of Chairman: Deryageldy Orazov.

The May 2012 election saw another change in leadership, as Vice Premier Sapardurdy Toylyev was unanimously voted Chairman by the delegates present. Additionally, the conference adopted a new logo.

Association staff

Tournament
Ýokary Liga
Turkmenistan Cup

National team
Turkmenistan national football team
Turkmenistan women's national football team
Turkmenistan national under-23 football team

References

External links
 Turkmenistan official site
 Turkmenistan at FIFA site
 Turkmenistan at AFC site

Football in Turkmenistan
1992 establishments in Turkmenistan
Turkmenistan
Sports organizations established in 1992
Sports governing bodies in Turkmenistan